BellSouth Building may refer to:
BellSouth Building (Atlanta): BellSouth Telecommunications headquarters (corporate headquarters is also in Atlanta at the Campanile Building), now called Tower Square.
BellSouth Building (Nashville): regional headquarters, now called AT&T Building.

See also
BellSouth